The South Carolina Military Academy was a predecessor, two-campus institution to The Citadel. It was established in 1842 by the South Carolina Legislature.

South Carolina had constructed a series of arsenals around the state after the Denmark Vesey planned slave revolt of 1822; these were consolidated into Columbia and Charleston arsenals. No longer seen as militarily necessary, they became in 1842 the South Carolina Military Academy, consisting of the Arsenal Academy in Columbia and the Citadel Academy in Charleston. During the Civil War students from both served as the Battalion of State Cadets; classes continued, with interruptions. SCMA cadets fired the first shots of the Civil War on January 9, 1861 while manning a gun emplacement on Morris Island, South Carolina which shelled the Union steamship Star of the West; the Battalion of State Cadets made up over a third of a Confederate force that defended a strategic rail bridge in the Battle of Tulifinny in 1864, the only occasion when the entire student body of an American college fought in combat.

The Arsenal Academy was burned by Union troops in 1865 and never reopened; the only surviving building became the South Carolina Governor's Mansion. The Citadel Academy and the South Carolina Military Academy closed in 1865; its buildings were in Federal hands until 1882. An 1882 act of the South Carolina Legislature reopened the South Carolina Military Academy, using only the campus in Charleston.  Known commonly as The Citadel Academy, the school was renamed in 1910 as The Citadel, after the name "Academy" became common to high schools rather than colleges.

Further reading
 

Defunct universities and colleges in South Carolina
The Citadel, The Military College of South Carolina
1842 establishments in South Carolina
1865 disestablishments in South Carolina
Defunct United States military academies